Mervyn Brian Muggleton (4 September 1941 – 12 May 2022) was an Australian cricketer and baseball player.

The son of Merv Muggleton, who had played baseball for Sturt and South Australia, Muggleton was born in Adelaide, South Australia, but moved with his family to Perth, Western Australia, in 1949, after his father was transferred. He made his state cricket debut for Western Australia during the 1964–65 season, scoring 21 and 12 runs in a Sheffield Shield match against New South Wales as a middle-order batsman. Muggleton's next matches at first-class level did not come until the 1969–70 season. He scored only 17 runs from four innings, and was not selected for Western Australia again.

Muggleton was also a keen baseballer, playing for Western Australia in Claxton Shield matches and for the Melville Braves at club level, where his father had coached for 16 seasons. After his retirement from playing, Muggleton remained involved with Melville in several different roles, serving as coach during the 1977–78, 1978–79, 1979–80, and 1990–91 seasons, and as president during the 1978–79 and 1981–82 seasons. He was a life member of the club.

See also
 List of Western Australia first-class cricketers

References

External links
 

1941 births
2022 deaths
Australian baseball players
Australian cricketers
Baseball coaches
Cricketers from Adelaide
Western Australia cricketers